George McManus (1884–1954) was an American cartoonist, creator of Bringing up Father.

George McManus may also refer to:

 George McManus (baseball) (1846–1918), baseball manager
 George McManus (politician) (1806–1887), Ontario MPP
 George A. McManus Jr. (born 1930), Republican member of the Michigan Senate, 1991–2002
 George H. McManus (1867–1954), U.S. Army general